Moonswept is the final studio album by the folk trio The Roches, released in 2007. The trio did not release any further studio albums before Maggie Roche's death in January 2017.

Track listing

 "Us Little Kids"
 "Only You Know How"
 "No Shoes"
 "Moonswept"
 "Family of Bones"
 "That Naughty Lady of Shady Lane"
 "Long Before"
 "Piggy Mask"
 "Huh"
 "Stop Performing"
 "Gung Ho"
 "Instead I Choose"
 "September 11th at the Shambhala Center"
 "Jesus Shaves"

References

2007 albums
The Roches albums